Ken Nicholson is a video game developer.

Career
Nicholson is a video game developer and Windows graphics pioneer.  He was the founder of GamePC Consortium and inventor of the technology used by Microsoft as the basis for Windows' DirectX graphics. Examples include:

Exidy games: Crossbow, Cheyenne, Combat, Clay Pigeon, Crackshot, Chiller, Spin-A-Ball, Top Secret, Vertigo, Vortex
Epyx games: California Games for Commodore 64, The Games: Summer Edition for Commodore 64 and IBM PC
Media Vision games: Quantum Gate, Quantum Gate II, Critical Path, Forever Growing Garden
Strategic Simulations games: Secret of the Silver Blades for MS-DOS
ATI games: Mortal Kombat III for Windows 95, Super Bubsy for Windows 95

References

External links

Dungeons & Dragons video game designers
Living people
Video game designers
Year of birth missing (living people)
Place of birth missing (living people)